The Second Coming is the second studio album by the Japanese doom metal band Church of Misery, released on June 9, 2004 by Diwphalanx Records.

Five of the seven tracks were based on and titled after infamous serial killers Ted Bundy, Mark Essex, Andrei Chikatilo, Aileen Wuornos and Dean Corll.

The album also contains a cover of "One Way...or Another" by Cactus.

Track listing

Personnel
Tatsu Mikami – bass
Hideki Fukazawa – vocals, synthesizer
Takenori Hoshi – guitar
Junji Narita – drums

2004 albums
Church of Misery albums